John Gravel (born October 27, 1941) is a former ice hockey defenceman who played 16 seasons of professional hockey from 1962 to 1978. Gravel played eight games in the World Hockey Association during 1972–73 WHA season with the Philadelphia Blazers.

Awards
The IHL awarded Gravel the Leading Rookie Award for the 1962-63 season, and he received the Governor's Trophy as the IHL's most outstanding defenceman during the 1969-70 season.

External links

1941 births
Living people
Canadian ice hockey defencemen
Ice hockey people from Montreal
Philadelphia Blazers players